Gary Varvel (born 1957) is a conservative editorial cartoonist. Varvel was the editorial cartoonist for Indianapolis Star from 1994 to 2019. He was the chief artist for The Indianapolis News for 16 years. His works are syndicated with Creators Syndicate.

Career

Cartooning
Varvel was inspired by Mad when he was younger, as well as by artist Pat Oliphant, cartoonist Mike Peters, and editorial cartoonist Jeff MacNelly. He worked as a sports editor and cartoonist at the Danville High School newspaper, where he won first place in a cartoon contest held by the paper. After graduating in 1975, he studied art at Indiana University–Purdue University Indianapolis. He worked for about a year at a weekly newspaper before he was hired in 1978 as the newsroom artist at The Indianapolis News, where he worked until 1994.

He began work as the editorial cartoonist for Indianapolis Star in 1994 following the retirement of Pulitzer Prize-winning Charles Werner. He was awarded the H. Dean Evans Legacy Award for community service in 2006. In 2010, he received the Grambs Aronson Award for Cartooning with a Conscience for a series of cartoons about child poverty. That same year, the National Cartoonists Society awarded him the Reuben Award in the Best Editorial Cartoonist division.

In the week before Thanksgiving in 2014, the Indianapolis Star published a cartoon by Varvel that was widely criticized as being racist.  In the cartoon, a white family is seen inside their dining room at a dinner table with an unhappy father holding a baked turkey saying  "Thanks to the President's immigration order, we'll be having extra guests this Thanksgiving," while darker skinned people can be seen climbing through their window. The Star later removed the mustache of one of the intruders, and executive editor Jeff Taylor deleted the cartoon entirely and issued an apology one day later. In the apology, Taylor wrote, "Gary did not intend to be racially insensitive in his attempt to express his strong views about President Barack Obama's decision to temporarily prevent the deportation of millions of immigrants living and working illegally in the United States."

Varvel was inducted into the Indiana Journalism Hall of Fame in October 2015. In 2018, another cartoon spurred an apology by the Indianapolis Star after some readers viewed Varvel's message as demeaning to women and sexual assault victims.

In 2019, he retired from the Indianapolis Star.

Writing
Varvel co-wrote The Board (a 2008 short film) and The War Within (a 2014 film) with his son, Brett. Both films were produced by House of Grace Films, Brett's Christian film production company. He also wrote a children's book titled The Good Shepherd (2014), released through the film production company.

He also writes the syndicated comic Off Center.

Selected awards and honors 
In addition to the following selected awards and honors, Varvel is a fifteen-time winner of the Indiana Society of Professional Journalists' Award for Best Editorial Cartoon and a thirteen-time winner of the Best Editorial Cartoonist Award in the Hoosier State Press Association.

Personal life
Varvel was born in 1957 in Indianapolis, Indiana to Forest and Priscilla Varvel, and grew up in Danville, Indiana. He has three children with his wife, Carol.

References

1957 births
Living people
American editorial cartoonists
Artists from Indianapolis
The Indianapolis Star people
People from Brownsburg, Indiana